Luigi Marzullo (born 25 July 1953), better known as Gigi Marzullo, is an Italian journalist, television presenter and writer.

Born in Avellino, Marzullo started his career as a journalist for the newspaper Il Mattino, then in 1983 he became a collaborator of RAI TV. Since 1989 he hosts the Rai 1 late night talk show Sottovoce (previously titled until 1994 Mezzanotte e dintorni).

References

External links  
 

Living people
Italian journalists
Italian male journalists
1953 births
Italian television presenters
People from Avellino